The Northern Minnesota Wetlands ecoregion is a Level III ecoregion designated by the United States Environmental Protection Agency (EPA) in northern Minnesota in the United States. Designated as ecoregion number 49, the ecoregion is sparsely populated and generally features conifer bog, mixed forest, and boreal forest vegetation. Much of the Northern Minnesota Wetlands is covered by standing water although some low-gradient streams and rivers occur in the eastern part; lakes in the region tend to have lower phosphorus and algae concentrations than some other parts of the state due to an abundance of forests and less agriculture.

Level IV ecoregions 
Following is a list of smaller Level IV ecoregions within the Northern Minnesota Wetlands ecoregion, as defined by the EPA.

See also 
 List of ecoregions in the United States (EPA)
 List of ecoregions in Minnesota
 Geography of Minnesota
 Climate of Minnesota

References 

Ecoregions of Minnesota